Patricia Ann Priest (born August 15, 1936) is an American actress known for portraying the second Marilyn Munster on the television show The Munsters (1964–1966) after the original actress, Beverley Owen, left after 13 episodes.

Early life
Priest was born and raised in Bountiful, Utah. Her father was Roy Priest and her mother, Ivy Baker Priest, was the United States Treasurer from January 28, 1953, to January 29, 1961. American paper currency printed during Ivy Baker Priest's tenure bore her signature. Priest resided in Washington, D.C., with her mother. She graduated in 1954 from Washington-Lee High School in Arlington, Virginia. She is also a graduate of Marjorie Webster Junior College.

Priest served as a page girl at the 1952 Republican National Convention.

She was crowned as the first International Azalea Festival Queen in Norfolk, Virginia, in 1954.

Career

Show business
Early in her career, Priest worked as a singer and actress on local television stations, including WTTG in Washington, D.C. In the late 1950s, she acted in stage productions, including Bus Stop and The Tender Trap.

Priest replaced actress Beverley Owen on the television sitcom The Munsters; Owen departed the series after the first 13 episodes in order to get married. Marilyn's character was a running gag, as she was a beautiful blonde treated as the ugly member of a family composed of a Frankenstein's monster for an uncle, a vampire for an aunt, a vampire for a grandfather, and a werewolf for a cousin.

The studio replaced Priest with Debbie Watson (12 years Priest's junior) in the role of Marilyn Munster in the 1966 feature Munster, Go Home! (1966) instead of Priest, as Watson was under contract to the studio, which had plans to make her a film star.

After the series ended, Priest appeared on episodes of television programs such as Bewitched, Perry Mason, Death Valley Days and The Mary Tyler Moore Show, in which she played Sue Ann Nivens's unappreciated younger sister.

Priest's film roles included Looking for Love (1964) with Connie Francis, Easy Come, Easy Go (1967) with Elvis Presley, the horror film The Incredible Two-Headed Transplant (1971) with Bruce Dern and Some Call It Loving (1973) starring Zalman King.

After acting
Priest retired from acting in the 1980s, but continues to attend some of the nostalgia conventions and Munsters revivals around the country.

She had previously restored and sold homes in Idaho, where she has lived for over two decades, before retiring.

Personal life
Priest has been married twice and has two sons.

In 2001, Priest was diagnosed with non-Hodgkin's lymphoma. She finished maintenance treatments at St. Luke's Mountain States Tumor Institute and was later determined to be in remission.

Selected filmography

References

External links
 
 Glamour Girls of the Silverscreen
 Meet Actress Pat Priest of “The Munsters!” video on Vimeo.com

1936 births
Living people
American film actresses
American television actresses
American Latter Day Saints
Debutantes of the International Debutante Ball
People from Bountiful, Utah
Actresses from Washington, D.C.
Actresses from Utah
20th-century American actresses
Washington-Liberty High School alumni